The Cooperative State Research, Education, and Extension Service (CSREES) was an extension agency within the U.S. Department of Agriculture (USDA), part of the executive branch of the federal government.  The 1994 Department Reorganization Act, passed by Congress, created CSREES by combining the former Cooperative State Research Service and the Extension Service into a single agency.

In 2009, CSREES was reorganized into the National Institute of Food and Agriculture (NIFA).

Mission
CSREES' mission is to "advance agriculture, the environment, human health and well-being, and communities" by supporting research, education, and extension programs at land-grant universities and other organizations it partners with.  CSREES doesn't conduct its own research; it provides funding and leadership to land-grant universities and competitively granted awards to researchers in partner organizations.
CSREES' areas of involvement span across 60 programs in the biological, physical, and social sciences related to agricultural research, economic analysis, statistics, extension, and higher education.

Funding
CSREES administers federal appropriations through three funding tools: competitive grants, formula grants, and congressionally directed funding.

Competitive Grants
Competitive grants are awarded to applicants upon the recommendation of a peer-review panel.  CSREES' competitive programs include the National Research Initiative, the Small Business Innovation Research Program, the Biotechnology Risk Assessment Program, and Outreach and Assistance for Socially Disadvantaged Farmers and Ranchers.

Formula Grants
CSREES supports research and extension activities at land-grant institutions through federal funds that are appropriated to states on the basis of statutory, population-based formulas.  CSREES' formula grants are directed to state experiment stations, the Cooperative Extension System, and Cooperative Forestry Programs.  In most cases, the states are required to match the federal formula dollars with nonfederal contributions.
The four CSREES research funding programs for land-grant universities are (1) Hatch, (2) Multistate Research (a subset of Hatch), (3) McIntire-Stennis, and (4) Animal Health.

Congressional Directed Funding
Congress directs CSREES to fund and administer certain programs each year through special appropriations accounts.  In general, the Executive Branch does not support the inclusion of these programs in the president's annual budget submission to Congress.  Examples of projects include: the Expert Integrated Pest Management (IPM) Decision Support System; Global Change, UV-B Monitoring; IPM and Biological Control; Minor Crop Pest Management, IR-4; and Minor Use Animal Drugs.

Research
CSREES is the USDA's extramural research agency, funding individuals; institutions; and public, private, and non-profit organizations.  Its research programs address issues affecting 13 national emphasis areas:

Agriculture and Food Biosecurity
Agricultural Systems
Animals & Animal Products
Biotechnology & Genomics
Economics & Commerce
Education
Families, Youth & Communities
Food, Nutrition & Health
International
Natural Resources & Environment
Pest Management
Plants & Plant Products
Technology & Engineering

Supported research falls into three categories:

Basic research: discovers the underlying processes and systems that make a plant, animal, ecosystem, community, or marketplace work.
Applied research: expands on basic research to uncover practical ways this knowledge can benefit individuals and society.
Integrated research: research is expected to generate new knowledge and/or apply existing knowledge quickly through dissemination of information on specific issues.

Education
Education programs support all CSREES emphasis areas and promote teaching excellence, enhance academic quality, and help develop the scientific and professional workforce.  CSREES continues a federal-state teaching partnership started in 1977 by strengthening agricultural and science literacy in K-12 education, improving higher education curricula, and increasing the diversity and quality of future graduates to enter the workforce.

In 1981, Agriculture in the Classroom (AITC) was established to promote agricultural literacy in classrooms across the country. Today, AITC provides lesson plans, professional development opportunities, and teacher recognition programs for teachers, as well as maintains a national resource directory and other sources of public information on K-12 agricultural education issues.

Cooperative Extension System
The Cooperative Extension System is a non-formal educational program implemented in the United States designed to help people use research-based knowledge to improve their lives. The service is provided by the state's designated land-grant universities. In most states, the educational offerings are in the areas of agriculture and food, home and family, environment, community economic development, and youth and 4-H. The National 4-H Headquarters is located within the Families, 4-H, and Nutrition unit of CSREES.

The Smith-Lever Act, which was passed in 1914, established the partnership between agricultural colleges and the USDA to support agricultural extension work. The act also stated that USDA provide each state with funds based on a population-related formula. As of around 1929, African Americans made up 24 percent of the South's population, but only 12 percent of the southern extension staff. Additionally, the New Mexico extension service hired only one temporary part-time bilingual home demonstrator in its first 15 years, even though half the population only spoke Spanish.
Today, CSREES distributes these so-called formula grants annually in cooperation with state and county governments and land-grant universities.

Traditionally, each county of all 50 states had a local extension office. This number has declined as some county offices have consolidated into regional extension centers. Today, there are approximately 2,900 extension offices nationwide.

Since 2005, the Extension system has collaborated in developing eXtension.org (pronounced "e-extension"). eXtension is an Internet-based learning platform where Extension professionals and citizens nationwide and beyond have 24/7 access to unbiased, research-based, peer-reviewed information from land-grant universities on a wide range of topics. Information is organized into articles, professional development resources, news, frequently asked questions, and blog posts that provide a knowledge-to-action service that has become an integral part of the Cooperative Extension System. In 2015, the nonprofit, member-based eXtension Foundation was created to advance innovation and technology-enhanced professional development going forward.

This table summarizes the cooperative extension programs in each state. (Under the 1890 amendment to the Morrill Act, if a state's land-grant university was not open to all races, a separate land-grant university had to be established for each race.  Hence, some states have more than one land-grant university.)

See also
 Agricultural extension
 Community food projects
 List of land-grant universities
 National Association Of County Agricultural Agents

References

External links
 CSREES Website
 eXtension Website
 National 4-H Headquarters Website
Proposed and finalized federal regulations from the Cooperative State Research, Education, and Extension Service

Agricultural organizations based in the United States
Rural community development

United States Department of Agriculture agencies
1994 establishments in the United States
2009 disestablishments in the United States